Blue Creek Township is one of twelve townships in Adams County, Indiana. As of the 2020 census, its population was 1,540. The majority of the Township, some two thirds, speak an Amish form of Bernese German, a Swiss German dialect, as their mother tongue.

Geography

Demographics

Unincorporated towns
 Salem

Major highways

Cemeteries
The township contains the following cemeteries: Blue Creek Amish, Sipe (no longer exists), Tricker (Blue Creek), and Willard (Mt. Hope).

School districts
 Adams Central Community Schools
 South Adams Schools

Political districts
 Indiana's 6th congressional district
 State House District 79
 State Senate District 19

References
 
 United States Census Bureau 2007 TIGER/Line Shapefiles
 United States National Atlas

External links
 Indiana Township Association
 United Township Association of Indiana

Townships in Adams County, Indiana
Townships in Indiana